Stříbrnice may refer to the following places in the Czech Republic:

 Stříbrnice (Přerov District), a village in Přerov District
 Stříbrnice (Uherské Hradiště District), a village in Uherské Hradiště District